Yolet is a commune in the Cantal département in south-central France.

Population

People linked to the commune 
 Jean-Baptiste Carrier (1756-1794), French Revolutionary 
 Jean de Roquetaillade (1310-1365), French Franciscan alchemist

See also
Communes of the Cantal department

References

Communes of Cantal
Auvergne